Rice Lake is a city in Barron County, Wisconsin, United States. As of the 2020 census, the city had a total population of 9,040. The city is located mostly within the Town of Rice Lake.

History
Rice Lake was named in 1870 after nearby Rice Lake. A post office has been in operation in Rice Lake since 1872.

Geography
Rice Lake is located at  (45.498408, -91.738844).

Rice Lake is along the Red Cedar River.

Climate

Demographics

As of 2000, the median income for a household in the city was $34,637, and the median income for a family was $53,056. Males had a median income of $40,450 versus $30,211 for females. The per capita income for the city was $22,354. About 6.9% of families and 13.3% of the population were below the poverty line, including 13.4% of those under age 18 and 13.1% of those age 65 or over.

2010 census

As of the census of 2010, there were 8,438 people, 3,936 households, and 2,065 families residing in the city. The racial makeup of the city was 96.2% White, 0.3% African American, 0.9% Native American, 0.8% Asian, 0.5% from other races, and 1.3% from two or more races. Hispanic or Latino of any race were 2.4% of the population.

There were 3,936 households, of which 24.3% had children under the age of 18 living with them, 37.6% were married couples living together, 10.9% had a female householder with no husband present, 4.0% had a male householder with no wife present, and 47.5% were non-families. 39.3% of all households were made up of individuals, and 17.6% had someone living alone who was 65 years of age or older. The average household size was 2.09 and the average family size was 2.79.

The median age in the city was 41.2 years. 20.6% of residents were under the age of 18; 10.1% were between the ages of 18 and 24; 23.5% were from 25 to 44; 24.5% were from 45 to 64; and 21.2% were 65 years of age or older. The gender makeup of the city was 46.8% male and 53.2% female.

Infrastructure
U.S. Highway 53, Wisconsin Highway 48, County Road SS (Main Street), and County Road O (South Access Road) are the main routes in the city.

The area is served by Rice Lake Regional Airport - Carl's Field (KRPD), which is located south of Rice Lake.

Rice Lake formerly had passenger rail service at the Rice Lake station.

Education

Public schools
Rice Lake Area School District operates public schools:
 Rice Lake High School
 Northern Lakes Regional Academy
 Rice Lake Middle School
 Haugen Elementary
 Hilltop Elementary
 Tainter Elementary

Private schools
 Redeemer Lutheran School
 St. Joseph School

Post-secondary education
 University of Wisconsin–Barron County
 Northwood Technical College, formerly Wisconsin Indianhead Technical College - Rice Lake Campus

Economy
Rice Lake serves as a shopping, industrial, educational, and medical hub for the surrounding rural communities of Barron, Cameron, Chetek, Shell Lake, Cumberland, Spooner, Ladysmith.

Notable people

 Kenny Bednarek - American sprinter
 John G. Blystone - film director
 Edward R. Brunner - justice of  Wisconsin Court of Appeals
 Howard W. Cameron - Wisconsin State Senator
 William M. Conley - federal judge
 William Henry Dietz - college and NFL head coach
 Henry Ellenson - professional basketball player for the New York Knicks
 Foster Friess - businessman
 Eric G. Gibson - Medal of Honor recipient 
 Hal Kolstad - MLB player
 Isaac J. Kvam - Wisconsin State Representative
 Dick Lane - announcer, film and television actor
 James P. Leary- folklorist
 Warren D. Leary - Wisconsin State Representative
 Michael A. Lehman - Wisconsin State Representative
 Susan Ludvigson  - poet in South Carolina
 Pug Lund - football player
 Harold Olsen - head coach of Ohio State, Northwestern and NBA's Chicago Stags, member of Naismith Memorial Basketball Hall of Fame
 Clay Perry - MLB player
 Jason Rae - Secretary of Democratic National Committee
 Kapp Rasmussen - Wisconsin State Representative and lawyer
 Fred Thomas - MLB player
 John W. Vaudreuil - U.S. Attorney
 Ann Cameron - children's book author living in Guatemala

Sister cities
Rice Lake has two sister cities:
  Miharu, Japan
  Žamberk, Czech Republic

Local media
 WAQE (AM) 1090, Talk & Sports
 WAQE-FM 97.7, All the Stars, All the Time
 WJMC (AM) 1240, Good Friends and Great Information 
 WJMC-FM 96.1, The Best Country Station, Number One
 WKFX FM 99.1, Classic Hits
 WWJP-LP FM 101.7, 3ABN Radio, Christian
 WYRL-LP FM 105.5, Eclectic Music, Local Government Discussion

References

External links

 City of Rice Lake
 Rice Lake Chamber of Commerce
 Sanborn fire insurance maps: 1893 1899 1917

Cities in Wisconsin
Cities in Barron County, Wisconsin